The Great Rosebud Hoax is an eight-track mini LP by Australian alternative rock group, The Stems, which was released in late 1987.

Track listing
 "She's a Monster"
 "Make You Mine"
 "Can't Resist"
 "Tears Me In Two"
 "Love Will Grow"
 "Just Ain't Enough"
 "Jumping To Conclusions"
 "Under Your Mushroom"

 
The Stems albums
1986 EPs